Jordan Jesús Silva Díaz (born 30 August 1994) is a Mexican professional footballer who plays as a centre-back for Liga MX club Cruz Azul.

Club career

Toluca
On 13 April 2014, Silva made his professional debut against Club León.

Tijuana
In May 2019 it was confirmed, that Silva had joined Club Tijuana.

International career

Youth
On September 18, 2015, Silva was selected by coach Raul Gutierrez to play in the 2015 CONCACAF Men's Olympic Qualifying Championship.

Senior
Silva got his first call up to the senior national team for matches against New Zealand and Panama in October 2016. On 8 December 2021, he scored his first goal for Mexico in a friendly match against Chile.

Career statistics

International

International goals
Scores and results list Mexico's goal tally first.

Honours
Cruz Azul
Copa MX: Apertura 2018

Mexico U23
Pan American Silver Medal: 2015
CONCACAF Olympic Qualifying Championship: 2015

Individual
CONCACAF Olympic Qualifying Championship Best XI: 2015

References

External links
 
 
 

1994 births
Liga MX players
Living people
Footballers from San Luis Potosí
Footballers at the 2015 Pan American Games
Footballers at the 2016 Summer Olympics
Olympic footballers of Mexico
Pan American Games medalists in football
Pan American Games silver medalists for Mexico
Deportivo Toluca F.C. players
Cruz Azul footballers
Club Tijuana footballers
Club América footballers
Mexico international footballers
Mexican footballers
Association football defenders
Medalists at the 2015 Pan American Games
People from Matehuala